Mayoral elections were held in the Pitcairn Islands in December 2010. Incumbent Mike Warren was re-elected.

Campaign
The election was marked by negative campaigning, with some campaigning taking place after the legal deadline.

Results

Aftermath
Following the election, a petition was circulated with a view to changing the electoral law retrospectively. Although it was signed by almost 30 people, including some Councillors, several signatures were later withdrawn and the petition was rejected by the Governor.

References

Pitcairn
Pitcairn
Elections in the Pitcairn Islands
2010 in the Pitcairn Islands
Pitcairn
Election and referendum articles with incomplete results